The pommel horse is an artistic gymnastics apparatus. Traditionally, it is used by only male gymnasts. Originally made of a metal frame with a wooden body and a leather cover, the modern pommel horse has a metal body covered with foam rubber and leather, with plastic handles (or pommels).

Apparatus

History 

The apparatus originates from the Romans, who used wooden horses to teach mounting and dismounting. They later added it to the ancient Olympic Games. The basic modern exercises were developed in the early 19th century by Friedrich Ludwig Jahn, founder of the German Turnverein.

Dimensions 
Measurements of the apparatus are published by the Fédération Internationale de Gymnastique (FIG) in the Apparatus Norms brochure.
 Height from top surface to floor:  ± 
 Length at top:  ± 
 Length at bottom:  ± 
 Width at top:  ± 
 Width at bottom:  ± 
 Height of the pommels:  ± 
 Distance between the pommels:  –  (adjustable)

Routines 

A typical pommel horse exercise involves both single leg and double leg workouts.  Single leg skills are generally in the form of scissors.  Double leg workout however, is the main staple of this event.  The gymnast swings both legs in a circular motion (clockwise or counterclockwise depending on preference) and performs such skills on all parts of the apparatus.  To make the exercise more challenging, gymnasts will often include variations on a typical circling skill by turning (moores and spindles), by straddling their legs (Flairs), placing one or both hands on the pommel or the leather, or moving up and down the horse placing their hands on the pommel and/or the leather (travelling).  Routines end when the gymnast performs a dismount, either by swinging his body over the horse or going through a handstand to land on the mat.  The pommel horse, its gymnastic elements, and various rules are all regulated by the Code of Points.

Pommel horse is considered one of the more difficult men's events.  While it is well noted that all events require a certain build of muscle and technique, pommel horse tends to favor technique over muscle.  This is because horse routines are done from the shoulders in a leaning motion and that no moves need to be held, unlike other events.  Therefore, stress induced in one's arms is reduced, meaning less muscle is needed in this event than events like still rings or parallel bars.

International level routines 

A pommel horse routine should contain at least one element from all element groups:
Single leg swings and scissors
Circles and flairs, with and/or without spindles and handstands
Side and cross support travels
Dismounts

Scoring and rules 
As with all events in the Fédération Internationale de Gymnastique guidelines, form is crucial to any successful routine.  For pommel horse, form consists of keeping one's feet pointed and legs straight during the entire routine.  The gymnast should keep his legs together during all elements, exceptions being scissors, single legged elements, and flairs where, conversely, the degree and control of separation are considered important.  Points are also deducted for not using all three sections of the horse and pausing or stopping on the apparatus.  Deductions also apply for brushing and hitting the apparatus.

Olympic pommel horse medalists

The most decorated and successful Olympic pommel worker in history is Great Britain's Max Whitlock, with three medals including two gold medals. Two other gymnasts have three pommel horse Olympic medals across three Games; Romania's Marius Urzică with one gold and two silver medals, and Whitlock's compatriot and teammate Louis Smith with two silvers, and a bronze - under historic rules Smith would have shared gold in 2012, but was awarded silver behind Kristian Berki after a tie was broken on execution score. 

Three other pommel workers have two Olympic gold medals, and each is considered a legend of the sport; the Soviet Union gymnast Boris Shakhlin. the Yugoslav Miroslav Cerar and the Hungarian master, Zoltán Magyar.

World pommel horse medalists

Pommel horse has been contested at World Championships from their inauguration. The record for most World victories is held by several workers at 3. Three of the four double Olympic champions, Miroslav Cerar, Zoltan Magyar and Max Whitlock have each won the World title three times, to set the record for combined global titles at 5. The most decorated workers at World Championships are Whitlock, Xiao Qin and Kristian Berki, both with three gold and two silver medals.

Bold numbers in brackets denotes record number of victories.

References

Artistic gymnastics apparatus